Oxford International College (OIC) is an independent college based in central Oxford, United Kingdom for girls and boys from 14 to 18 years. The school teaches GCSE and A-Level courses to prepare students for entry into British universities. In 2019, they were the number 1 ranking UK boarding school according to the UK A Levels League Table, with 91.84% of students scoring A*/A for their A Levels examination.

References

External links
Oxford International College official website

International schools in England
Private schools in Oxfordshire
Nord Anglia Education